The MicroFreak is a synthesizer manufactured by French music technology company Arturia and released in 2019. Described as a "Hybrid Experimental Synthesizer", it uses 18 digital sound engines (algorithms) to synthesize raw tones. This digital oscillator is then fed into a multi-mode analog filter, giving the MicroFreak its hybrid sounds.

Sound engines 
The MicroFreak has 18 distinct sound engines (as of the 4.0 update). 

They are:
Basic Waves - a standard synth voice using traditional waveforms,
Super Wave - a group of detuned waves (like a supersaw),
Harmonic - a form of additive synthesis where you set volumes of frequencies individually,
Karplus-Strong - a physical modelling system to replicate string sounds,
Wavetable - a method of synthesis where the waveform transitions through a table of different waveforms,
Noise - various types of noise and static.
Virtual Analogue - a standard subtractive synth voice,
Waveshaper - a triangle wave that is repeatedly wavefolded,
Frequency Modulation (two operators) - a method of synthesis where a wave modulates the frequency of another wave,
Formant - a form of granular synthesis,
Chords - an engine that plays groups of notes paraphonically,
Speech - a vocal synthesizer,
Modal - a physical modelling engine that replicates the sound of hollow objects,
Bass - another waveshaping algorithm specifically for basslines,
Harm - a mixture of waveshaping and additive synthesis,
SawX - a supersaw being phase modulated,
Vocoder - a voice transformer similar to a talkbox,
And User Wavetable - an engine to use your own wavetables.
Of those, 8 are made by Arturia (Basic Waves, Super Wave, Harmonic, Karplus-Strong and Wavetable, Noise, Vocoder and User Wavetable), 7 are made by Mutable Instruments (Virtual Analogue, Waveshaper, Two operator FM, Formant, Chords, Speech and Modal) from their "Plaits" eurorack module, and the remaining 3 are made by Noise Engineering.

Updates 
One of the USPs of the MicroFreak was its numerous firmware updates and improvements. Arturia continued to improve the user experience years after the original release of the MicroFreak.

Major update timeline 
1.0 - MicroFreak is released with this firmware.
2.0 - Added Noise engine, chord mode and scale quantisation.
2.1.3 - Added Vocoder engine. Vocoder edition is released with this firmware.
3.0 - Added Noise Engineering oscillators, unison mode and more preset slots.
4.0 - Added User Wavetable Engine and 64 more preset slots.

Reception 
The MicroFreak was received very well from the synthesizer community. It is considered by some to be one of the best value for money synthesizers of modern times. According to the music production website MusicTech it has "an enormous amount to offer and will really reward exploratory use".

Review ratings 
The MicroFreak received many high reviews on retail websites and specialist music blogs:
9/10 from MusicTech (MusicTech Choice Award)
9/10 from MusicRadar
4.6/5 on Amazon Reviews
4.8/5 on Sweetwater

Impact

Legacy 
The MicroFreak brought affordable digital synthesis to the masses and was popular due to its many sound engines and modulation options. It inspired future synthesizers and got many people into music production as a first synthesizer.

The Freak Range 
Following the success of the MicroFreak, Arturia made more versions and improvements to the MicroFreak and its successors. It received a limited edition white Vocoder design in 2020. 

 In 2022, during their 'Rendez-Vous' livestream, Arturia released the MiniFreak, a larger 6 voice polyphonic upgrade of the MicroFreak with an extra oscillator. It improved upon the Microfreak and took into consideration some original criticisms of the MicroFreak.

See also 
Arturia MiniBrute – another synthesizer by the same company

External links 
https://noiseengineering.us/ and https://mutable-instruments.net/ - the two other companies that contributed sound engines to the Microfreak

References 

Synthesizers
Musical instruments
Electronic musical instruments
Music production
Music technology